Paul Hoffmann (25 March 1902 – 2 December 1990) was a German actor. He appeared in more than sixty films from 1937 to 1990. From 1968 to 1971 Hoffmann was director of the Burgtheater in Vienna.

Selected filmography

References

External links 

1902 births
1990 deaths
German male film actors
Commanders Crosses of the Order of Merit of the Federal Republic of Germany